Steinkjersannan or Sannan is a neighborhood of town of Steinkjer in the municipality of Steinkjer in Trøndelag county, Norway. From the 17th century until the 2005, the area was used as a military camp.

References

Steinkjer